Ibaraki may refer to any of the following places in Japan:

 Ibaraki Prefecture, one of the 47 prefectures of Japan
Ibaraki, Ibaraki, a town in Ibaraki Prefecture
Ibaraki Airport, an airport in Omitama, Ibaraki
Ibaraki dialect, the dialect spoken in Ibaraki Prefecture
 Ibaraki, Osaka, a city in Osaka Prefecture

It can also refer to:
 Ibaraki-dōji, an oni (demon or ogre) from Japanese legend
 Ibaraki (play), a kabuki play by Kawatake Mokuami
 Miss Ibaraki (Tsukuba Kasumi), Japanese friendship doll
 Ibaraki, a side project of Trivium vocalist Matt Heafy